Phinikas (Greek: Φοίνικας, also spelled Φοίνηξ in Katharevousa and Phoenix in English, meaning Palm tree) is an abandoned village in the Paphos District of Cyprus, located 3 km northeast of Anarita.

See also 
 Ghost town

References

Communities in Paphos District